Project Sanguine was a U.S. Navy project, proposed in 1968 for communication with submerged submarines using extremely low frequency (ELF) radio waves.   The originally proposed system, hardened to survive a nuclear attack, would have required a giant antenna covering two fifths of the state of Wisconsin. Because of protests and potential environmental impact, the proposed system was never implemented.  A smaller, less hardened system called Project ELF consisting of two linked ELF transmitters located at Clam Lake, Wisconsin  and Republic, Michigan  was built beginning in 1982 and operated from 1989 until 2004.  The system transmitted at a frequency of 76 Hz.  At ELF frequencies the bandwidth of the transmission is very small, so the system could only send short coded text messages at a very low data rate.  These signals were used to summon specific vessels to the surface to receive longer operational orders by ordinary radio or satellite communication.

Proposed system

The cables were grounded at their ends, and loops of AC electric current flowed deep in the ground between the ends of the cable, generating ELF waves; this is called a ground dipole. The original design was projected to cost billions and consume 800 megawatts of power. The goal was a system that could transmit tactical orders one-way to U.S. nuclear submarines anywhere in the world, and survive a direct nuclear attack.

The project was controversial from the start and was attacked by politicians, antiwar and environmental groups concerned about the effects of high ground currents and electromagnetic fields on the environment. The nuclear survivability of the system was made doubtful by Soviet development of MIRV ballistic missiles. After an attempt to resite the project in the Llano Uplift of Texas was also stopped by public opposition, the Navy abandoned Sanguine and proposed a series of increasingly modest variants: Project Seafarer (1975), Austere ELF (1978), and finally Project ELF (1981), which was constructed.   This lower power system required 15 minutes to transmit each code group, so it was not used to transmit tactical orders directly but instead served the function of a "bell ringer", ordering a specific vessel to surface and receive further orders by ordinary radio or satellite communication.   The system became nominally operational in 1989, 20 years after it first went online as "test facility," and was used until 2004, when the US Navy declared it obsolete and it was shut down and dismantled.

Project ELF

The scaled-down system the Navy constructed in 1969, called Project ELF, began official testing in 1982 and became officially operational in 1989. The two transmitters normally operated synchronized together as one antenna for greater range, but could also operate independently. The scaled down system was not designed to survive a nuclear attack.

The Clam Lake facility, which served as the test site and was originally called the Wisconsin Test Facility (WTF) consisted of two  transmission line antennas (called ground dipoles) in the shape of a cross, with the transmitter station at their intersection. The Republic facility consisted of three transmission lines, two  and one , in the shape of the letter "F" (the shape is not significant and was dictated by land availability). The lines, made of  aluminum cable supported on insulators on  wooden utility poles, resembled ordinary power transmission lines.

The transmitters operated at a frequency of 76 Hz in the extremely low frequency band, with an alternate capability at 45 Hz and used a combined power of 2.6 megawatts. They were able to communicate with submarines over about half the world's surface. The system transmitted continuously, 24 hours a day, sending an "idle" message when it was not being used, so that submarines could verify they were within communication range.

Because of the extremely small bandwidth of the ELF band, the transmitters had a very slow data rate. They couldn't transmit voice (audio) but only short coded text messages of a few letters. Reportedly it took 15 minutes to transmit a single three-letter code group. Therefore the system was not used to relay operational orders, but served a "bell-ringer" function, ordering specific submarines to the surface to receive detailed orders by ordinary radio and satellite communications links.

The system was controversial, and was the target of legal attacks, suits and protests throughout its operating life. On five occasions protesters cut down transmission line poles, interrupting operation briefly.

In 2004, the Navy shut down both transmitters, with the explanation that very low frequency (VLF) communication systems had improved to the point that the ELF system was unnecessary.

How ELF communication works

Submarines are shielded by seawater from all ordinary radio signals, and therefore are cut off from communication with military command authorities while submerged. However radio waves of very low frequency can penetrate seawater; the lower the frequency the deeper in the ocean they can penetrate. Waves in the VLF range of 3 kHz to 30 kHz are able to penetrate to a depth of about 10 to 30 meters, and since WWII navies have used VLF transmitters to communicate with submarines. To receive VLF signals subs must rise to just under the surface or trail a shallow antenna buoy, making them vulnerable to detection by the enemy.

Radio waves in the extremely low frequency (ELF) band of 30 to 300 Hz can penetrate to a depth of hundreds of meters, allowing them to communicate with submarines at their normal operating depth. The lower the frequency, the longer the wavelength of the radio waves, and transmitters require longer antenna structures to generate them. ELF transmitters use huge antennas called ground dipoles consisting of tens to hundreds of kilometers of overhead cables resembling ordinary power transmission lines. The transmission lines are grounded at the ends, and looping currents deep in the Earth form part of the antenna. Because even these huge antennas are much smaller than the ELF wavelengths, they are extremely inefficient; only a tiny fraction of the input power is radiated as ELF waves, with the rest dissipated as heat in antenna resistance. At their full input power of 2.6 MW, both US ELF transmitters working together only generated about 8 watts of ELF radiation. This weak signal was able to reach submarines over half the globe only because of the extremely low attenuation of ELF waves of 1–2 dB per 1000 kilometers. ELF transmitters are most efficient when sited over certain low conductivity underground rock formations, which forces the currents to spread deeper through a larger volume of rock, forming a larger "antenna". The US system was located in Wisconsin and the Upper Peninsula of Michigan over the Laurentian Shield formation, for that reason.

Such ELF transmitters cannot be installed on submarines, because of the size of the antenna and high power requirements. So ELF communication is one-way, with a receiver in the submarine receiving orders from a shore station, but unable to reply. The low attenuation of ELF waves with distance allows a single ELF station to send messages to submarines all over the world.

Another drawback of ELF is that the ELF band has very small bandwidth, and therefore could only transmit very simple messages, very slowly. ELF signals cannot carry audio (voice) like other types of radio, and can only carry short text messages consisting of a few letters. The US Navy system (above) reportedly uses three-letter code groups and requires 15 minutes to transmit one group. So, the systems were not used to transmit detailed orders but served a "bell ringer" function, to order a specific vessel to surface and receive further orders by ordinary radio or satellite communication.

Other ELF transmitters
The US, Russia, India, and China are the only nations known to have constructed ELF communication facilities. The Indian Navy has an operational ELF communication facility at the INS Kattabomman naval base to communicate with its Arihant class and Akula class submarines. The Russian Navy reportedly operates an ELF transmitter, ZEVS, located northwest of Murmansk on the Kola Peninsula in northern Russia.

See also
Extremely low frequency
Ground dipole
Communicating with submarines
JASON Defense Advisory Group
 Through the earth mine communications

References

Footnotes

Bibliography

 
 

Military radio systems of the United States
Abandoned military projects of the United States